Mau & Ricky is a Venezuelan Latin pop and reggaeton duo formed by singer-songwriter brothers Mauricio Alberto "Mau" Reglero Rodríguez (born August 17, 1993) and Ricardo Andrés "Ricky" Reglero Rodríguez (born November 21, 1990), both sons of Argentine-Venezuelan singer Ricardo Montaner.

Songs such as the "Mi Mala" remix featuring Karol G, Becky G, Leslie Grace and Lali (which peaked at No. 44 on the Hot Latin Songs), have catapulted onto the Latin Urban Pop charts.

The duo has released an EP, Arte, on Sony Music Latin, and an album Para Aventuras y Curiosidades, which peaked at No. 3 on Billboards Latin Pop.

They were nominated for the 2017 Latin Grammy Award for Best New Artist and Song of the Year and chosen by YouTube Music as the only Latin Artist to be part of "Artist on the Rise" in 2019.

Early life 
Mauricio Alberto and Ricardo Andrés Reglero Rodriguez were born in Caracas, Venezuela, to the filmmaker Marlene Rodríguez, and Ricardo Montaner, an Argentine-born Venezuelan singer-songwriter. They were raised until the ages of 7 and 10 in Caracas before moving to Miami, Florida. They have a sister Evaluna and two older half-brothers, Alejandro Manuel and Héctor Eduardo, from their father's first marriage. Mau y Ricky are bilingual, speaking both English and Spanish. They also volunteered in their parents foundation La Ventana de Los Cielos.

Music career 
They began studying music at the ages of 4 and 6 years respectively and started their music career playing weekly at a church in a band that they co-founded. In 2011 they began performing as MR until 2015, when they changed the name of the duo to Mau & Ricky.

Arte and Para Aventuras y Curiosidades 

In 2017, they released "Arte", their first EP under the umbrella of Sony Music Latin.

In May 2019, they released their album "Para Aventuras y Curiosidades" which has peaked at No. 3 on Billboard's Latin Pop charts and stayed on the Billboard charts for 39 weeks straight. The album has received multiple diamond and platinum records in the US and has been in numerous other Billboard Charts. The album got a finalist position for the 2020 Billboard Latin Music Awards in Latin Pop Album of the Year category.

In January 2020, Mau y Ricky were featured in 3 singles (Thalía "Ya Tú Me Conoces", Tini "Recuerdo" and Ovy on the Drums "Sigo Buscándote").

In November 2020, they released their album "Rifresh".

Songwriter collaborations 
As composers, they have written songs for several singers including Chayanne, Thalía, Leslie Grace, Miguel Bosé, Diego Boneta, Cristian Castro, Ricky Martin, Karol G and Ednita Nazario.

Some of their music compositions include diamond selling tracks among which are "Ya No Tiene Novio" (Sebastián Yatra, Mau y Ricky), "Sin Pijama" (Becky G, Natti Natasha), Vente Pa´Ca (Ricky Martin, Maluma) and "Pa’Dentro" (Juanes).

Discography 

 Para Aventuras y Curiosidades (2019)
 Rifresh (2020)

Filmography

Awards 
At the 18th Annual Latin Grammy Awards in 2017, Mau y Ricky were nominated for the Latin Grammy Award for Best New Artist for their album Arte and the Latin Grammy Award for Song of the Year for "Vente Pa' Ca". They won the Gardel Award for Song of the Year for their song "Sin Querer Queriendo", alongside Lali.

In 2019 they were chosen by Youtube Music as the only Latin Artist to be part of "Artist On The Rise" in 2019.

Concert tours 

Headlining
 Dos Desconocidos Tour (2019)
Argentina Tour '21 (2021)
Opening act
 Teen Angels – Teen Angels Tour (2011)
 Camila Cabello – Never Be the Same Tour (2018)
 Marc Anthony – Legacy Tour

References

External links

 

Latin music songwriters
Latin pop singers
21st-century Venezuelan male singers
Venezuelan pop singers
Venezuelan expatriates in the United States
Singers from Caracas
Musicians from Miami
Musical groups from Los Angeles
Venezuelan people of Argentine descent
Sony Music Latin artists